is the Japanese craft of making paper stencils for dyeing textiles. It is designated one of the Important Intangible Cultural Properties of Japan. The art is traditionally centered on the city of Suzuka in Mie Prefecture.

Description
Multiple layers of thin  paper are bonded with a glue extracted from persimmon, which makes a strong flexible brown coloured paper. The designs can be extremely intricate, and consequently fragile. Nowadays the stencils are sometimes sold as artwork, attached to hand fans, or used to decorate screens and doors in Japanese rooms. For kimono printing the stencils are stabilized by attaching them to a fine silk net. In past times, human hair was used instead of silk, but silk is less likely to warp and can be finer.

Technique

Four principal cutting techniques are used:
 Pulling the knife towards the artist, which results in long straight cuts.
 Carving patterns, which allows for figurative designs.
 Cutting circular holes, often in fan-like designs 
 Using shaped punches.

The stencils are then used for resist dyeing. Rice paste is passed through the stencil onto silk. When dyed, the color does not adhere to the areas with rice paste. By multiple alignments of the stencil, large areas can be patterned. This technique was developed in France as silk screen printing. The stencil is not generally used for more than one kimono, though multiple stencils can be cut at the same time.

History

Later paper stencils developed alongside kimono. The technique is known as  since towns in Ise Province, now Mie Prefecture, were historic centres of the craft. Production is now primarily localised around the town of Suzuka.

Conservation
The Ise-Katagami Stencil Museum in Suzuka opened in 1997.

Collections 
They were among the visual resources collected by Arthur Silver as inspiration for designs for wallpapers and textiles.

See also

Important Intangible Cultural Properties of Japan
National Treasures of Japan – Dyeing and Weaving

References

External links

 Timeline (in Japanese)

Japanese paper
Japanese dyeing techniques
Textile patterns
Paper art
Important Intangible Cultural Properties of Japan
Culture in Mie Prefecture
Japanese words and phrases